The 2018 Morelos Open was a professional tennis tournament played on outdoor hard courts. It was the fifth edition of the tournament which was part of the 2018 ATP Challenger Tour. It took place in Cuernavaca, Mexico between 19–24 February 2018.

Singles main draw entrants

Seeds 

 1 Rankings as of 12 February 2018.

Other entrants 
The following players received wildcards into the singles main draw:
  Tigre Hank
  Thanasi Kokkinakis
  Luis Patiño
  Manuel Sánchez

The following players received entry from the qualifying draw:
  Roberto Cid Subervi
  Sebastian Fanselow
  Emilio Gómez
  Gerardo López Villaseñor

Champions

Singles 

 Dennis Novikov def.  Christian Garín 6–4, 6–3.

Doubles 

 Roberto Maytín /  Fernando Romboli def.  Evan King /  Nathan Pasha 7–5, 6–3.

References

2018
Morelos Open
Mex